Stafford Center is an unincorporated community in Stafford Township, DeKalb County, Indiana.

Geography

References

Unincorporated communities in DeKalb County, Indiana
Unincorporated communities in Indiana